The Scania-Vabis L36 was a medium sized truck produced by Swedish automaker Scania-Vabis between 1964 and 1968.

Scania-Vabis L36 
By the early 1960s, Scania-Vabis’ trucks had grown so large they were no longer fit for urban distribution duty. Therefore, in the autumn of 1964 the company presented a smaller model called L36. It had a four-cylinder engine that was also offered with turbocharger. The short engine allowed for the cab to be mounted unusually far forward. The truck had a payload capacity of 5 to 6 tonnes and sported dual circuit air brakes.

Engines

References

External links 

 Scania Group - history
 Swedish brass cars - picture gallery

L36
Vehicles introduced in 1964